The Niger national under-20 football team represents Niger in international football through the Nigerien Football Federation, a member of Confederation of African Football (CAF). Niger plays in the colors of the flag of Niger, white, green and orange. 
Their nickname comes from the Dama gazelle, native to Niger, the Hausa name of which is Meyna or Ménas The Dama appears on their badge in the colors of the national flag.

Players
The following squad was called up of recent 2021 Arica U-20 Cup of Nations qualifiers.

Recent fixtures & results
The following is a list of match results from the previous 12 months, as well as any future matches that have been scheduled.

2019

Competitive records

FIFA U-20 World Cup

Africa U-20 Cup of Nations

References

External links

African national under-20 association football teams
under-20